Merel Freriks (born 6 January 1998) is a Dutch female handball player for Brest Bretagne Handball and the Dutch national team.

She represented the Netherlands at the 2019 World Women's Handball Championship.

Achievements

Club
German league (Bundesliga):
Winner: 2021 (with Borussia Dortmund Handball)
Runner up: 2022 (with Borussia Dortmund Handball)

International
World Championship
Gold: 2019
European Championship
Bronze: 2018

References

External links

1998 births
Living people
Dutch female handball players
People from Haarlemmermeer
Expatriate handball players
Dutch expatriate sportspeople in Germany
Handball players at the 2020 Summer Olympics
Sportspeople from North Holland
21st-century Dutch women